Khondab is a city in Markazi Province, Iran

Khondab or Khandab may also refer to various places in Iran:
 Khondab, Hamadan, a village in Hamadan Province
 Khondab, Qazvin, a village in Qazvin Province
 Khondab, Qom, a village in Qom Province
 Khandab, Zanjan, a village in Zanjan Province
 Khondab County, in Markazi Province
 Khondab Rural District, in Markazi Province